Rank comparison chart of officers for navies of Hispanophone states.

Officers

See also
Comparative navy officer ranks of the Americas
Ranks and insignia of NATO navies officers

References

Military ranks of Hispanophone countries 
Military comparisons